Zhaojue County is a county in the south of Sichuan Province, China. It is under the administration of the Liangshan Yi Autonomous Prefecture. It has a population of  322,600 as of 2021, including 98.53% Yi. The name Zhaojue is a transliteration in Chinese of the Yi words for 'mountain eagle's plain', or 'sloped plain'.

Atulie'er Village

The remote Atulie'er village (Atulie'ercun), is located in the Zhi'ermo Township of Zhaojue County. The village was the focus of a Chinese news video and photojournalism that became international news in May, 2016. Villages such as Atuli'er are often dubbed cliff villages due to their height and remoteness.

Climate

See also
Chengbei Township, Zhaojue County

References

 
Liangshan Yi Autonomous Prefecture
Amdo
County-level divisions of Sichuan